The ergot is a small callosity (Calcar metacarpeum and Calcar metatarseum) on the underside of the fetlock of a horse or other equine. Some equines have them on all four fetlocks;  others have few or no detectable ergots. In horses, the ergot varies from very small to the size of a pea or bean, larger ergots occurring in horses with "feather" – long hairs on the lower legs.

Ergot comes from the French word for rooster's spur.

Evolution

Like the chestnut, the ergot is thought to be a vestige of some part of the ancestral foot of the multi-toed Equidae, the ergot corresponding to the sole pad of other extant members of Perissodactyla, such as the tapir and rhinoceros.  Unlike the chestnut, which in the same individual may be large on the forelegs and smaller or even absent on the hindlegs, according to Ridgeway, the ergot is of roughly equal size on all four legs. However, as stated above, it is often noted that the ergot can be absent on some or all legs.

See also
Equine forelimb anatomy

References

External links
About.com: Parts of the horse:  the ergot

Horse anatomy